John Charles Duncan (February 8, 1882 in Knightstown, Indiana – September 10, 1967 in Chula Vista, California) was an American astronomer.

Life
John Charles Duncan was the son of Daniel Davidson and Naomi, née Jessup, Duncan. He graduated from Indiana University and received his Bachelor of Arts there in 1905. In 1905/1906, he received the first Lawrence Fellowship donated by Percival Lowell to students of Indiana University at the Lowell Observatory in Flagstaff, Arizona, and participated in the photographic search for Trans-Neptunian planets. In the summer of 1912 he returned to the Lowell Observatory to help with the search. After receiving his Master of Arts in 1906, he began his doctoral studies at the University of California under the director of the Lick Observatory William Wallace Campbell, and in 1909 defended his dissertation on the Cepheids Y Sagittarii and RT Aurigae.

Duncan was a lecturer at Harvard University from 1909 to 1916, and from 1911 until 1916 also at Radcliffe College, before he was appointed in 1916 the professor and director of the Astronomy Department of Wellesley College and director of the Whitin Observatory. After retiring in 1950, he spent the next twelve years as a visiting professor at the Steward Observatory.

Much of his later work was closely linked to the Mount Wilson Observatory, which he visited for the first time in 1920–21, and where he spent the summers from 1922 to 1949 as a volunteer. There he took numerous photographs of galaxies and nebulae, explored the extent and filaments of the Crab Nebula, and discovered three variable stars in the Triangulum Nebula. His textbook on astronomy was republished several times, from the first edition in 1926 through the fifth edition in 1955, and an abridged 1947 edition.

Duncan was a Fellow of the Royal Astronomical Society and the American Astronomical Society (as Secretary of the later from 1936 to 1939), as well as a member of the International Astronomical Union, and since 1938 the American Association for the Advancement of Science, the American Academy of Arts and Sciences and numerous other scientific organizations. The asteroid 2753 Duncan, discovered on 18 February 1966 at the Goethe Link Observatory, was named after him.

John Charles Duncan was married to Katharine Armington Bullard since 1906, with whom he had a daughter.

Selected works

References

External links
Steward Observatory at the University of Arizona
Work by and with John Charles Duncan at SOA/NASA Astrophysics Data System
2753 Duncan (1966 DH) in the JPL Small-Body Database
A later photo of Dr. Duncan

1882 births
1967 deaths
University of Arizona faculty
American astronomers
People from Knightstown, Indiana
Fellows of the American Association for the Advancement of Science
Fellows of the Royal Astronomical Society
Fellows of the American Academy of Arts and Sciences
Harvard University alumni
University of California alumni
Scientists from Indiana